Queen or QUEEN may refer to:

Monarchy 
 Queen regnant, a female monarch of a Kingdom
 List of queens regnant
 Queen consort, the wife of a reigning king
 Queen dowager, the widow of a king
 Queen mother, a queen dowager who is the mother of a reigning monarch

Arts and entertainment

Fictional characters 
 Queen (Marvel Comics), Adrianna "Ana" Soria
 Evil Queen, from Snow White
 Red Queen (Through the Looking-Glass)
 Queen of Hearts (Alice's Adventures in Wonderland)
 Queen, a character from the video game Deltarune

Gaming 
 Queen (chess), a chess piece
 Queen (playing card), a playing card with a picture of a woman on it
 Queen (carrom), a piece in carrom

Music
 Queen (band), a British rock band
 Queen (Queen album), 1973
 Queen (Kaya album), 2011
 Queen (Nicki Minaj album), 2018
 Queen (Ten Walls album), 2017
 "Queen", a song by Estelle from the 2018 album Lovers Rock
 "Queen", a song by G Flip featuring Mxmtoon, 2020
 "Queen", a song by Jessie J from the 2018 album R.O.S.E.
 "Queen", a song by Melvins from the 1994 album Stoner Witch
 "Queen", a song by Perfume Genius from the 2014 album Too Bright
 "Queen", a song by Shawn Mendes from the 2018 album Shawn Mendes
 "Queen", a 2021 track by Toby Fox from Deltarune Chapter 2 OST from the video game Deltarune
 "Queen", a song by Tracey Thorn from the 2018 album Record
 "Q.U.E.E.N.", a 2013 song by Janelle Monáe
 Queen Records, a former subsidiary record label of King Records

Other uses in arts and entertainment 
 Queen (magazine), a British women's magazine
 Queen: The Story of an American Family, a 1993 book by Alex Haley
 Alex Haley's Queen, a 1993 TV mini-series
 Queen (2014 film), an Indian comedy film
 Queen (2018 film), an Indian drama thriller 
 Queen (web series), an Indian political drama series

Places
 Queen, New Mexico, US
 Queen, Pennsylvania, US

Religion and folklore 
 May Queen, or Queen of May, a personification of the May Day holiday
 Queen of Heaven, a title of Mary, the mother of Jesus
 Queen of Heaven (antiquity), a title given to a number of ancient goddesses

Science 
 Queen, a reproductive female caste in eusociality
 Queen ant
 Queen bee
 Queen (butterfly), Danaus gilippus
 Queen, an un-neutered female cat

Transportation 
 Queen (Canadian automobile), built from 1901 to 1903
 Queen (English automobile), built from 1904 to 1905
 Queen (American automobile), built from 1904 to 1907
 Queen station, a subway station in Toronto, Ontario, Canada
 Queen (ship), the name of several ships
 Queen (East Indiaman)

Other uses 
 Queen (name), a given name and surname (including a list of people with the name)
 Drag queen, a person, usually a male, imitating female signifiers for entertainment purposes
 Queen (slang), a slang term for a flamboyant or effeminate gay man
 Quaternary Environment of the Eurasian North (QUEEN), a climate research project in the Arctic
 Queen Fine Foods  
 Queen sized bed
 Sabrina Frederick, Australian rules footballer nicknamed "Queen"

See also 
 
 
 Queen bee (disambiguation)
 Queen-mother (disambiguation)
 Queen of the South (disambiguation)
 Queen Street (disambiguation), any of several streets
 Queenie (disambiguation)
 Queening (disambiguation)
 Queens (disambiguation), including "Queen's"
 The Queen (disambiguation)
 Kween (disambiguation)
 Winter Queen (disambiguation)
 Le Queen, a night club in Paris